Lakshmi Saraswathi is a 1970 Indian Kannada-language film, directed by K. S. L. Swamy (Ravi) and produced by B. H. Jayanna. The film stars B. Saroja Devi, Ramesh, Sudarshan and R. Nagendra Rao in the lead roles. The film has musical score by Vijaya Bhaskar.

Cast

B. Sarojadevi as Lakshmi / Saraswathi
Ramesh as Venu, Lakshmi's husband
R. N. Sudarshan as Anand, a doctor
R. Nagendra Rao as Lakshmi and Saraswati's father
Ramadevi as Gundamma
Narasimharaju as Garageshwari Ranganathachar
M. N. Lakshmi Devi as Shanthamma, Ranganathachar's wife
Y. R. Ashwath Narayan
Baby Mala
Thoogudeepa Srinivas
H. R. Krishna Shastry
Manohar
C. L. Narayana Rao
Kodandu
Ragini in a cameo
B. V. Radha in a cameo
M. Jayashree in a cameo
Annapurnamma in a cameo
Lokanath in a cameo
Kumari Shantha
Kumari Saroja

References

External links
 
 

1970 films
1970s Kannada-language films
Films scored by Vijaya Bhaskar
Films directed by K. S. L. Swamy